Twin Bridges is a small unincorporated community on U.S. Route 50 near the Desolation Wilderness in El Dorado County, California. It has a population of 14 people according to census figures, however, as of 2008 the road sign lists the population at 10. Right after the town, the U.S. 50 eastbound starts a steep ascent to Echo Summit passing Sierra-at-Tahoe ski resort shortly before the summit.

When snow chains are required on the summit, Caltrans often establishes chain control in Twin Bridges. This is likely because of very limited availability of shoulders where chains can be installed on summit approaches.

The ZIP codes are 95721 and 95735. The community is inside area code 530.

The former ski area Edelweiss was just above Twin Bridges on US-50, at what is now called Camp Sacramento. It was the home hill for future Olympian ski racer Spider Sabich.

A post office opened in Twin Bridges in 1947.

Demographics
The population is 99% white; 1% Hispanic; 50% male, 50% female. The average household size is 2 and the average family size is 2.2. There are 125 housing units which are largely unoccupied vacation homes. 100% of the population speaks the English language.

See also
Lover's Leap (Tahoe, CA)

References

External links
 Statistics

Unincorporated communities in California
Unincorporated communities in El Dorado County, California
Unincorporated communities in the Sacramento metropolitan area
Lincoln Highway